Spiritwalker is a 2021 South Korean mystery action fantasy film, written and directed by Yoon Jae-geun. Starring Yoon Kye-sang, Park Yong-woo and Lim Ji-yeon, the film revolves around a amnesiac man who subsequently wakes up in a new body every twelve hours. It had its premiere at 20th New York Asian Film Festival on August 22, 2021, and was released theatrically on November 24, 2021, in South Korea.

The film topped the Korean box office for consecutive 2 weeks after its release. As of December 31, 2021 it is at 7th place among all the Korean films released in 2021 with 810,673 admission and US$6.62 million gross.

Premise
After waking up from a car crash unable to remember anything about his life, a secret agent named Kang I-an begins regaining consciousness in a new body every 12 hours. He must piece together his identity, all while evading attacks from pursuing agents and dangerous criminals alike, but with no memory and allies.

Cast
 Yoon Kye-sang as Kang I-an, a secret agent
 Park Yong-woo as Director Park, a secret agent
 Lim Ji-yeon as Moon Jin-ah, she is looking for Kang Eui-ah
 Park Ji-hwan as Haengryeo, Kang I-an's helper, a homeless person.
 Yoo Seung-mok as Chief Lee Shin-woo
 Lee Sung-wook as Yoo Dae-ri, a co-worker of Kang I-an
 Seo Hyun-woo as Baek Sang-sa
 Lee Woon-san as Ji Cheol-ho
 Hong Ki-joon as Go Joong-sa
 Joo Jin-mo as Director Hong
 Park Min-jung as Cake Lady
 Kim Min-kyung as Chairwoman Jeon
 Heo Dong-won as Fur coat

Production
On January 21, 2019, it was reported that Lim Ji-yeon has joined Yoon Kye-sang as female lead for the film tentatively titled as 'Fluid Renegades'. Yoon Kye-sang has acted as a mirror in 7 roles as he wakes in a different body after every 12 hours.

Filming began on January 15, 2019, after completion of casting line up.

Release
Spiritwalker had its premiere at 20th New York Asian Film Festival on August 22, 2021. It was also invited at 53rd Sitges Film Festival in 'Fantastic Panorama' section held from October 8 to 18, 2020. Apart from these festivals the film was invited to 5 other major film festivals as: 17th British Mayham Film Festival, the 35th German Fantasy Filmfest, The 6th London East Asian Film Festival, the 21st Trieste Science Fiction Film Festival, and the 41st Hawaii International Film Festival.

It has been sold to 107 countries before its theatrically release on November 24, 2021, in South Korea.

Home media
The film was made available for streaming on IPTV (KT Olleh TV, SK Btv, LG U+ TV), Home Choice (cable TV VOD), KT SkyLife TV, TVING, Naver TV, Wavve, Google Play, Cinefox, and KakaoPage from December 21, 2021.

Reception

Box office
The film was released on November 24, 2021, on 1213 screens. As per Korean Film Council (Kofic) integrated computer network, the film ranked first on the Korean box office on the opening weekend with 362,424 admissions. It kept its first place at the end of 2nd week with 679,919 admissions.

As of December 31, 2021 it is at 7th place among all the Korean films released in the year 2021, with gross of US$6.62 million and 810,673 admissions.

Critical response
Kim Mi-hwa from Star News reviewed that she praised the performance of actors and wrote, "If you expect solid acting and action from the actors, you will be able to feel the joy at the cinema after a long time since [onset of] Corona." Kang Hyo-jin from SPOTV News, referring to 2015 film Beauty Inside and  2002 film The Bourne Identity stated, "[it is the work] that gives the feeling of 'Beauty Inside' wearing the mask of 'Bon'". She concluded writing, "It contains interesting materials, cool and stylish action, and even a storyline that unravels the mystery. However, as the overall texture is good, even a small hole is a big disappointment." Kim Bo-ra from Yonhap News Agency referring to 1997 film Face/Off, 2000 film Memento,  2016 Japanese animated romantic fantasy film Your Name and Bourne Series stated, "Spritwalker combines the two subgenres in a more complicated way, placing the memory-impaired hero in a predicament by having his spirit transfer to another body every 12 hours." Kim concluded, "the film features Ian's mysterious situations and journey for personal identity from the beginning and catches the eyes of viewers with high-speed car chases, gun shootouts and hand-to-hand fight scenes."

Remake
Spiritwalker will be remade for United States audiences by Lorenzo di Bonaventura, who has produced G.I. Joe and Transformers film series.

Awards and nominations

References

External links
 
 
 
 

2021 films
2020s Korean-language films
Films postponed due to the COVID-19 pandemic
South Korean action thriller films
South Korean fantasy films
South Korean mystery thriller films
2020s chase films
Films about amnesia
Films about the illegal drug trade